Pierre Larquey (10 July 1884 – 17 April 1962) was a French film actor. He appeared in more than 200 films between 1913 and 1962. Born in Cénac, Gironde, France, he died in Maisons-Laffitte at the age of 77.

Selected filmography

 Patrie (1914)
 Monsieur le directeur (1925)
 Alone (1931) - Le comandant
 Tout s'arrange (1931) - Un ami de M. Ribadet
 American Love (1931) - Le maître d'hôtel à la barbiche (uncredited)
 Le disparu de l'ascenseur (1932) - Michaud - le secrétaire
 Prisonnier de mon coeur (1932)
 Vive la classe (1932) - L'adjudant
 The Miracle Child (1932) - Durieux père
 Le chien jaune (1932) - (uncredited)
 Topaze (1933) - Tamise
 Once Upon a Time (1933) - Redno
 Knock, ou le triomphe de la médecine (1933) - Le tambour de ville
  (1933) - Bouzin
 Madame Bovary (1934) - Hippolyte
 Mariage à responsabilité limitée (1934) - Georges Lambert - le mari
 We Are Not Children (1934) - M. Breton
 Street Without a Name (1934)
 Les Misérables (1934) - L'employé de Mairie (uncredited)
 The Scandal (1934) - Parizot
 Casanova (1934) - Pogomas
 Vive la compagnie (1934) - Le sergent Poponaz
 Le Grand Jeu (1934) - Gustin
 Le paquebot Tenacity (1934) - L'ivrogne
 La cinquième empreinte (1934) - Richard - le pâtissier
 Poliche (1934)
 Le greluchon délicat (1934) - Paperhanger
 Three Sailors (1934) - Gruchon
 Si j'étais le patron (1934) - Jules
 L'école des contribuables (1934) - Menu
 A Man of Gold (1934) - Moineau
 L'hôtel du libre échange (1934) - Pinglet
 Le cavalier Lafleur (1934) - Gonfaron
 L'auberge du Petit-Dragon (1934) - Le commissaire
 Dedê (1934) - (uncredited)
 Zouzou (1934) - Papa Melé
 Gold in the Street (1934) - Adolphe Tourbier - un chimiste
 Antonia (1935) - Le garçon
 Compartiment de dames seules (1935) - Monicourt
 Le clown Bux (1935) - Le clown Boum
    (1935) - Le Bègue
 Gangster malgré lui (1935)
 A Rare Bird (1935) - Valentin
 Le chant de l'amour (1935) - Casimir
 Second Bureau (1935) - Asjundant Colleret
 La rosière des Halles (1935) - Lucien Dunois
 J'aime toutes les femmes (1935) - Wessmaier
 Les beaux jours (1935) - Le père de Pierre
 Fanfare of Love (1935) - Emile
 Le bébé de l'escadron (1935) - Le fonctionnaire Mazure
 Un soir de bombe (1935) - Baudry-Duclin & Basu
 À la manière de... (1935) - Monsieur Fine, le prétendant de Madame Capefigue
 La marmaille (1935) - Bouton
 La petite sauvage (1935) - Dagobert, le concierge
 La mariée du régiment (1936)
 Taras Bulba (1936) - Sachka
 Le roman d'un spahi (1936) - Le colonel
 A Hen on a Wall (1936) - Bob Pouvrier
 Disk 413 (1936) - Belinsky - le fonctionnaire
 Seven Men, One Woman (1936) - L'entrepreneur Langlois
 Prête-moi ta femme (1936) - Adolphe Rissolin
 Les grands (1936) - Chamboulin
 Ménilmontant (1936) - Le père Jos
 The Bureaucrats (1936) - Le conservateur
 The Dying Land (1936) - Le père Lumineau
 La main passe (1936)
 La joueuse d'orgue (1936) - Magloire
 Romarin (1937) - Larquus
 La loupiote (1937) - Le père Ballot
 Trois artilleurs au pensionnat (1937) - Félicien, le pharmacien
 La griffe du hasard (1937) - Monsieur Lappe
 Police mondaine (1937) - Le commissaire Gustave Picard
 Rendez-vous Champs-Elysées (1937) - Totor
 The Citadel of Silence (1937) - Bartek
 Mademoiselle ma mère (1937) - Le patron de l'hostellerie
 The Club of Aristocrats (1937) - Miser
 The Green Jacket (1937) - Pinchet - le secrétaire perpétuel de l'Institut
 The Ladies in the Green Hats (1937) - Ulysse Hyacinthe
 Un scandale aux galeries (1937) - Monsieur Lafila
 Nights of Princes (1938) - Chouvaloff
 Titin des Martigues (1938) - Lacroustille
 Le monsieur de 5 heures (1938) - Montredon
 Ça... c'est du sport (1938) - Trapon
 Un soir à Marseille (1938) - Parpèle, le reporter
 Les filles du Rhône (1938) - Fabregas
 Trois artilleurs en vadrouille (1938) - Le pharmacien Zéphitard
 Clodoche (1938) - Clodoche
 Adrienne Lecouvreur (1938) - Pitou
 Un fichu métier (1938) - Casimir
 Le mariage de Véréna (1938) - Gustav Peters
 Monsieur Coccinelle (1938) - Alfred Coccinelle
 Mother Love (1938) - Raoul Dalaciaud - le patron de Gilbert
 Prince de mon coeur (1938) - Sekow - le préfet de police
 La cité des lumières (1938)
 Three Artillerymen at the Opera (1938) - Zéphitard
 Un gosse en or (1939) - Durand
 Les gangsters du château d'If (1939) - Esprit Saint
 Fort Dolorès (1939) - Jefke Vandenbom - le Belge
 Les otages (1939) - Fabien, l'huissier
 La tradition de minuit (1939) - Béatrix
 Grand-père (1939) - Grand-père
 His Uncle from Normandy (1939) - Maître Curot
 Une main a frappé (1939) - Valtat et Toto-la-Puce
 The Emigrant (1940) - Monrozat
 Sixième étage (1940) - Hochepot
 L'empreinte du Dieu (1940) - Mosselmanns
 Moulin Rouge (1940) - Perval
 Espoirs... (1941) - Martin
 Fromont jeune et Risler aîné (1941)
 Nous les gosses (1942) - Le père Finot
 Pension Jonas (1942) - Barnabé Tignol
 Le journal tombe à cinq heures (1942) - Phalanpin
 L'amant de Bornéo (1942) - Lajoie
 Soyez les bienvenus (1942) - Le régisseur
 Le Lit à colonnes (1942) - Dix-Doigts
 Le Mariage de Chiffon (1942) - Jean
 The Murderer Lives at Number 21 (1942) - Monsieur Colin
 The Blue Veil (1942) - Antoine Lancelot
 The Benefactor (1942) - Noblet
 La grande marnière (1943) - Malaizot
 Une étoile au soleil (1943)
 Des jeunes filles dans la nuit (1943) - Anatole Bonnefous
 La Main du diable (1943) - Ange
 The Secret of Madame Clapain (1943) - Hurteaux
 L'homme qui vendit son âme (1943) - L'abbé Lampin
 Le Corbeau (1943) - Le docteur Michel Vorzet
 The Angel of the Night (1944) - Heurteloup (uncredited)
 La Rabouilleuse (1944) - Jean-Jacques Rouget
 La collection Ménard (1944) - Le psychiatre fou
 Father Goriot (1945) - Le père Goriot
 Sylvie and the Ghost (1946) - Baron Eduard
 Faut ce qu'il faut (1946)
 Song of the Clouds (1946) - Le jardinier du château
 La Tentation de Barbizon (1946) - Jérôme Chambon
 Jericho (1946) - Béquille
 Goodbye Darling (1946) - Édouard
 Six Hours to Lose (1947) - Joseph
 Sybille's Night (1947) - Ancelin
 La colère des dieux (1947) - Emmanuel
 La femme en rouge (1947) - Le père Simon
 Quai des Orfèvres (1947) - Emile Lafour, un chauffeur de taxi
 La cabane aux souvenirs (1947) - Le Pacha
 Carré de valets (1947) - Arthur Bonpain - un cambrioleur
 Cab Number 13 (1948) - Pierre Loriot, il cocchiere (segments "Delitto" & "Castigo")
 La renégate (1948) - Ricardo
 The White Night (1948) - Emile
 The Secret of Monte Cristo (1948) - Jacob Muller
 Passeurs d'or (1948) - Père Maes
 The Woman I Murdered (1948) - René Dufleuve
 La bataille du feu (1949) - Pascla Brignoux
 La maternelle (1949) - Paulin
 Night Round (1949) - Monsieur Labiche
 Millionaires for One Day (1949) - Jules Martin dit "Père Jules", le doyen des François
 La souricière (1950) - Le juge Gravelle
 The Ferret (1950) - Monsieur Thiais
 Menace de mort (1950) - Morel
 * Le Grand Cirque (1950) - Le curé
 Plus de vacances pour le Bon Dieu (1950) - Le père Antoine
 On n'aime qu'une fois (1950) - Ravenel
 Old Boys of Saint-Loup (1950) - Monsieur Jacquelin - le directeur du collège
 The Marriage of Mademoiselle Beulemans (1950) - Le curé
 Topaze (1951) - Tamise
 La peau d'un homme (1951) - Frédéric Sabat
 The Beautiful Image (1951) - L'oncle Antonin
 Le passage de Vénus (1951) - Virgile Seguin
 Le Dindon (1951) - Géronte
 Mammy (1951) - Dr. André Pierre
 Et ta soeur (1951) - Maître Blaisot
 Monsieur Octave (1951) - Monsieur Octave
 Trois vieilles filles en folie (1952) - Sébastien
 Monsieur Leguignon, Signalman (1952) - M. Petitot
 The Red Head (1952) - Le parrain
 The Nude Dancer (1952) - Charmois
 Crazy for Love (1952) - Testu
 Le curé de Saint-Amour (1952)
 Grand Gala (1952) - M. Punch, le clown
 My Husband Is Marvelous (1952) - Le père Henri
 Mandat d'amener (1953)
 The Porter from Maxim's (1953) - Le chanoine Mercey
 Little Jacques (1953)
 Maternité clandestine (1953) - Pépère, le clochard
 The Cucuroux Family (1953) - Jean
 Minuit... Champs-Elysées (1954) - Monsieur Gilbert
 Royal Affairs in Versailles (1954) - Un guide du musée de Versailles
 Tabor (1954) - L'aumônier
 Trois jours de bringue à Paris (1954) - Le cultivateur Colladan
 Faites-moi confiance (1954) - Merlin l'Enchanteur
 Le congrès des belles-mères (1954) - Le maire
 Les Diaboliques (1955) - M.Drain, professeur
 Madelon (1955) - Le curé
 Si Paris nous était conté (1956) - Pierre Broussel
 Hello Smile ! (1956) - Lui même lançant le message à la radio (uncredited)
 Lovers and Thieves (1956) - Le maître-nageur
 Ah, quelle équipe! (1957) - Pierre Maurel dit M. Pierre
 The Crucible (1957) - Francis Nurse
 Les Espions (1957) - Le chauffeur de taxi
 Mon coquin de père (1958) - Monsieur Breton
 La p... sentimentale (1958) - Le grand-père
 Ça n'arrive qu'aux vivants (1959) - Le gardien de nuit
 Soupe au lait (1959) - Le pharmacien
 The President (1961) - Augustin
 Par-dessus le mur (1961) - Le trimardeur
 Les bras de la nuit (1961) - Belleau
 La traversée de la Loire (1962)
 Dossier 1413 (1962) - M. Baranger, chimiste biologiste

References

External links
 
 

1884 births
1962 deaths
French male film actors
French male silent film actors
People from Gironde
20th-century French male actors